Nasal septal hematoma is a condition affecting the nasal septum. It can be associated with trauma.

A septal hematoma is blood that collects in the space between the septal cartilage and the overlying perichondrium (a cross section of the cartilaginous portion of the nasal septum). A hematoma may deprive the septal cartilage of its blood supply from the overlying mucosa and can lead to permanent sequelae.

The septal cartilage has no blood supply of its own and will receives all of its nutrients and oxygen from the perichondrium. An untreated septal hematoma may lead to the destruction of the septum and immediate drainage is necessary. Timely diagnosis and/or treatment of septal hematomas can cause what is called a saddle nose deformity.

This condition is more common in children because the septum is thicker and the lining more flexible.

Signs and symptoms

A normal nasal septum is rigid and thin. If you have a septal hematoma, your doctor will be able to press it down with a swab as the area will be soft. A quick check in the nose will show any swelling between the nostrils.

Symptoms can include:

 blockage in breathing
 change in nose shape
 painful swelling of nasal septum
 nasal congestion.

On occasion, it is possible for people with a septal hematoma to experience headache, nausea, vomiting, and fainting.

Causes
The most common causes of nasal septal hematomas include:

 broken nose (nasal fracture)
 medication 
 surgery or injury to the soft tissue area.

In adults, nasal septal hematoma typically occur with significant facial trauma and/or nasal fracture. However, in children, due to their thicker septum and more flexible lining, nasal septal hematoma can be caused from minor nasal trauma such as simple falls, collisions with stationary objects, or minor altercations with siblings.

Mechanism and pathophysiology 
The exact mechanism for the formation of hematoma from nasal trauma is controversial, but thought to occur in nasal septal hematomas when there is force to the nasal cartilage. The force causes the perichondrial blood vessels to leak and rupture in the nasal septum. The cartilage in the septum is avascular and can be 2–4 mm thick. The septum gets its blood supply from the ethmoid and sphenopalatine arteries.

The nasal septum is composed of cartilaginous, membranous, and bony components overlaid by mucoperichondrium and mucoperiosteum. Bleeding within the confines of the mucoperichnondrium leads to a septal hematoma, where as external bleeding from Kiesselbach's plexus results in epistaxis. The Kiesselbach plexus is located anterior inferior of the nasal septum, where the anastomosis of blood vessels is located.

Normal nasal mucosa is pink and healthy appearing, without ulcerations, crusting, or bleeding. Some common, abnormal variations include septal deviations, spurs, and an enlarged, aerated middle turbinate. Pale or inflamed mucosa, purulence, nasal polyps, or a septal perforation are all common pathologic features that may or may not be combined with the abnormal variations listed above.

Diagnosis

The doctor will use a nasal speculum for visualization of the nasal septum, the inferior turbinate, and a portion of the middle turbinate. The view of the nasal passage may be partially obstructed by the tools used. When there is minimal obstruction, it is often possible to visualize the nasopharynx.

Identifying the Nasal Septal Hematoma

If lateral bulging of the septum and fluctuance persist after the nasal administration of a vasoconstrictive agent, such as oxymetazoline, it is a strong indicator of a nasal septal hematoma.  A septal hematoma is highly likely in patients who have had trauma or a sudden onset of nasal blockage that does not resolve with the removal of blood clots and the administration of a vasoconstrictive agent.

Diagnosis can be made by a medical professional after performing an anterior rhinoscopy examination, by using an otoscope or a nasal speculum and overhead light source.

Sometimes palpitation is used to diagnose the hematoma.

Treatment
A septal hematoma requires urgent treatment from a doctor in order to stop any further complications arising.

Prompt treatment of septal hematomas can prevent complications such as ischemia of the septal cartilage, which can lead to permanent necrosis and a saddle-nose deformity. Such complication can occur rapidly, within as few as 3 days.

There are two different procedures used to achieve this and will be selected upon the size of the swelling or clot. If the condition is being treated promptly and is still relatively small, then a small incision can be made to allow the blood to flow out. If the septal hematoma has been left untreated, then a doctor may need to insert a mechanism in order to fully remove the blood from the area.

If left untreated, the hematoma can cause bacterial colonization that leads to infection. Within 72 hours, the infection can form a septal abscess.

Treating a septal hematoma requires it to be incised and drained to prevent avascular necrosis of the septal hyaline cartilage. This will depend on diffusion of nutrients from its attached nasal mucosa.

The septum can generally heal within 1 week, without any evidence of the incision. The mucosa will appear healthy and smooth.

Secondary infections can be prevented by starting the patient on an antibiotic regimen immediately after the procedure and continuing the treatment while the nasal packs are in place. If an abscess is present, a specimen of the abscess can be sent for culture to ensure that the antibiotics prescribed have provided adequate coverage. Culture-directed therapy can help avert dangerous late sequalae, including the intracranial extension of a septal abscess. If the hematoma is not promptly drained, the septal cartilage may be destroyed. In such cases, a saddle-nose deformity may develop.

Prognosis 
As long as the septal hematoma is treated promptly, a full recovery is common.  If the condition is left untreated and develops complications such as fever, infection, or an abscess, then the nasal septal hematoma is still very treatable if seen by a doctor. If saddle nose is developed, surgery could be required.

Epidemiology 
Septal hematomas are rare but can effect everyone in every age group. There is no exact number  of the incidence that occur because a lot of the cases will remain undiagnosed. Although, patients that have visited an ear, nose and throat clinic for nasal septal hematomas, reported to be in between 0.8% to 1.6% of patients. 65.6% of nasal septal hematoma cases in Nigeria had unknown cause, where 30.4% were caused by trauma.

Within 10 years at the University of Nigeria Teaching Hospital, there was a total of 53 patients that ranged from 5 to 65 years of age. Consisted of 37 males and 16 females. The highest age group with nasal septal hematoma was 10–18 years of age followed by 1–9 years of age.

Research 
The research article went into detail about a 9-month-old going to get medical attention after an incident that happened a week prior. The child had swelling in both sides of the septum, with no history of nose bleeds. Under the general anesthesia, a nasal drain was done by a 4mm endotracheal tube. The article explained how this procedure done by medical professionals, was a new innovative way to treat the child. The research article came into conclusion that all cases of nasal septal hematoma need immediate attention to prevent from having complications and deformities. The endotracheal tube is another alternative for the nasal pack and allowed the child to be at comfort in the postoperative period.

Based on a different study from patients who were treated at the University of Nigeria Teaching Hospital in Enugu Nigeria. This all occurred within a 10-year period, 53 patients were successfully treated by incision and drainage.

References

Nose disorders